Abueva is a surname. Notable people with the surname include:

 Calvin Abueva (born 1988), Filipino basketball player
 José Abueva (1928–2021), Filipino political scientist and scholar
 Napoleon Abueva (1930–2018), National Artist of the Philippines